Danionella cerebrum is a cyprinid fish species reported in 2021 from turbid low altitude streams on the southern and eastern slopes of the Bago Yoma mountain range in Myanmar. It was previously erroneously identified as Danionella translucida due to the close resemblance and similar geographical distribution of the two species. Adult fish of the species measure only 10-13.5 mm in size and have a brain volume of just 0.6 mm3 which is thus far the smallest known adult vertebrate brain. Danionella cerebrum larvae have been shown to exihibit similarities but also differences in their locomotor activity compared to the zebrafish (Danio rerio) to which they are evolutionary closely related.

Due to its miniature size, rich behavioural repertoire, and optical translucency that persits into adulthood, Danionella cerebrum holds great promise for non-invasive whole-brain in vivo imaging analyses with single cell resolution in an adult vertebrate and is beginning to emerge as a novel important model system in current neuroscience research.

References 

cerebrum
Fish of Myanmar
Fish described in 2021